Esdras Minville (November 7, 1896 in Grande-Vallée – December 9, 1975) was a Canadian writer, economist and sociologist.  He served as the Dean of the Faculty of Social Sciences at the Université de Montréal, and was the first French-Canadian to serve as head of HEC Montréal.  A staunch defender of Catholic social doctrine, Minville helped to found several co-operatives in the province.

He contributed to the Rowell-Sirois Commission, and chaired the  Montreal Chamber of Commerce in 1947.  His nationalist ideas resembled those of Victor Barbeau, François-Albert Angers and Lionel Groulx.

Published works
Invitation à l'étude, 1943
L'agriculture, 1943
Montréal économique, 1943
La forêt, 1944
L'homme d'affaires, 1944 
, 1946
Pêche et chasse, 1946
Les affaires: l'homme, les carrières, 1965

Awards 
Honorary doctorate from the University of Ottawa
Honorary doctorate from the Université Laval
Honorary doctorate from the Université de Sherbrooke
Honorary doctorate from the Université de Montréal
Member of the Royal Society of Canada
 1947 - Ludger-Duvernay Prize
 1968 - Innis-Gérin Medal

External links 
Canadian Encyclopedia

1896 births
1975 deaths
Writers from Quebec
Fellows of the Royal Society of Canada
Canadian sociologists
Canadian economists
People from Gaspésie–Îles-de-la-Madeleine
Canadian writers in French
Academic staff of HEC Montréal
Burials at Notre Dame des Neiges Cemetery